The Local Stigmatic is a 1990 film directed by David Wheeler and produced by and starring Al Pacino. It was filmed and edited during the late 1980s. It had a showing at the Museum of Modern Art in New York City in March 1990, but was never released theatrically.   It was released on DVD as part of "The Al Pacino Box Set" in June 2007.
The film is 56 minutes long.

It follows the story of two British friends who spend their time walking about London discussing dog track racing.

The Local Stigmatic is based on a stage play by Heathcote Williams.

Cast

Al Pacino - Graham
Paul Guilfoyle - Ray
Joseph Maher - David

Reception

The movie was not a critical success.

References

External links

American films based on plays
1990 films
Films scored by Howard Shore
1990s English-language films